The genus Tetrapedia contains approximately 13 species of small apid bees occurring in the Neotropics (from Mexico to Argentina), and they are unusual in possessing adaptations for carrying floral oils rather than (or in addition to) pollen or nectar. The floral oils are typically gathered from plants of the family Malpighiaceae, though other plants may be visited. They also apparently gather plant resins for use in nest cell construction, sometimes mixed with sand.

They are small bees (8–13 mm), generally black in color, though they may have yellow faces.

Apinae
Bee genera